De Huinsermolen is a smock mill in Húns, Friesland, Netherlands which was built in 1829. The mill has been restored to working order. It is listed as a Rijksmonument, number 8530.

History

Drainage of the  Huinserpolder started in 1828, initially by five windmills. These were replaced by De Huinsermolen, which was built by millwright Lieuwe Johannes van der Meulen of Leeuwarden in 1829. In 1937, plans were made to replace De Huinsermolen with a mechanical pump, but these plans were not carried through, mainly due to opposition from then miller Cees Hoitsma.  A three-cylinder Lister diesel engine was placed in the mill in 1958, working in conjunction with the windmill.

The mill was restored between 1978 and 1980 by millwright Dijkstra of Gytsjerk. The work included rethatching the mill and new Patent sails. In 1995, the mill was owned by Waterschap De Middelsékrite, Sneek, but it is now owned by Wetterskap Fryslân. A new pumping station was built alongside the mill in 2001. The mill is kept in working order and is used regularly.

Description

De Huinsermolen is what the Dutch describe as an grondzeiler. It is a three-storey smock mill on a single-storey base. There is no stage, the sails reaching almost to the ground. The mill is winded by tailpole and winch. The smock and cap are thatched. The sails are Patent sails. The sails are carried on a cast-iron windshaft, which was cast in 1877 by Prins van Oranje, The Hague, South Holland. The windshaft also carries the brake wheel which has 55 cogs. This drives the wallower (31 cogs) at  the top of the upright shaft. At the bottom of the upright shaft, the crown wheel, which has 44 cogs drives a gearwheel with 40 cogs on the axle of the Archimedes' screw. The axle of the Archimedes' screw is  diameter. It is inclined at 22°. Each revolution of the screw lifts  of water.

Public access
De Huinsermolen is open by appointment.

References

Windmills in Friesland
Windmills completed in 1829
Smock mills in the Netherlands
Windpumps in the Netherlands
Rijksmonuments in Friesland
Octagonal buildings in the Netherlands